Japanese popular culture includes Japanese cinema, cuisine, television programs, anime, manga, video games, music, and doujinshi, all of which retain older artistic and literary traditions; many of their themes and styles of presentation can be traced to traditional art forms. Contemporary forms of popular culture, much like the traditional forms, are not only forms of entertainment but also factors that distinguish contemporary Japan from the rest of the modern world. There is a large industry of music, films, and the products of a huge comic book industry, among other forms of entertainment. Game centers, bowling alleys, and karaoke parlors are well-known hangout places for teens while older people may play shogi or go in specialized parlors. Since the end of the US occupation of Japan in 1952, Japanese popular culture has been influenced by American media. However, rather than being dominated by American products, Japan localised these influences by appropriating and absorbing foreign influences into local media industries. Today, Japanese popular culture stands as one of the most prominent popular cultures around the world.

History
In as early as 1920, a discussion revolving around the use of culture and media communication was being used as a strategy to enhance the international understanding of Japan's perspective was set in place. The discussion began when Japan aspired to become an imperial and colonial power, one that was equivalent to their Euro-American counterparts. This idea was interrupted once Japan was defeated in World War II. With the economic struggles Japan faced after the war, the question about using culture and media communication was once again brought up. In order for Japan to reinvent themselves and allow others to see their true colors, Japan focused on projecting a selected national image by exporting appealing cultural products including, animation, television programs, popular music, films, and fashion. The public diplomacy wanted to allow other countries to understand their position on various issues by acting directly on the people of foreign countries. With the popularity of television emerging in Asian countries, they produced a show that was supposed to demonstrate the actual lives of Japanese people.

Before the popular television show Oshin aired in Asian countries, Japanese people were perceived as 'culturally odorless.' With this new TV drama, a sense of commonality began to form between Japan and other Asian nations. This show was a testimony to the capability media culture can have on enhancing the international understanding of negative historical memories of Japanese colonialism and the hostility regarding the country's economic exploitation of the region.    
     
The entertainment industry was vital to Japan's postwar reconstruction. The desire to create fantasies was present but, the economy drove the entertainment industry. Technology was the heart of Japan's rebuilding since, they believed it was the only reason they lost the war. Pop culture began to dominate the entertainment industry. For example, Japan used the resources they had in order to make toy cars that ultimately helped them rebuild the economy. After Japan was banned from using metal to make toys, they used old cans instead. In doing so, they were able to produce toys in exchange for food for the school children. The toy industry is just one of the industries that ultimately influenced pop culture during this era.     
     
Prior to World War II Japanese cinema produced films that supported the war efforts and encouraged Japanese citizens to fight for their country. The movie industry produced inspirational patriotic tales that portrayed Japanese militia as victors, heroes, and people who sacrificed themselves for a greater cause. However, the first cinematic blockbuster of the postwar era was Gojira which, did not share the same support as other films. For Japan, this film represented a return to popular entertainment that catered to the move towards technology. Gojira showed the destruction of Tokyo and the atomic bomb that victimized Japan during the war in order to gain opposition towards the war. Japanese cinema was dominated by militaristic storytelling and was controlled by the policies and agendas of Japan's totalitarian state. Films during the postwar era were used to foster new idols and icons in order for Japanese people to begin to reimagine themselves. Japanese cinemas produced films that demonstrated why they should be against the war and all the destruction and casualties that came along with it. As time went on the film industry progressed from targeting adult audiences to targeting children.

Cool Japan 

Cool Japan (クールジャパン Kūru Japan) refers to the rise of Japan's soft power and prevalence internationally as a cultural influence. These cultural elements project a message that markets and packages Japan as a nation of commerce and "pop culture diplomacy" as opposed to a militarily focused and driven country. Japan's actions during World War II made it necessary for the nation to rebuild their national image; moving away from a national image of military dominance and into an image of cultural diplomacy. Initiated by the Japanese government, the creation of the "soft power" image emerged, and Japan began to sell its pop culture as its new non-military image in order to promote its own culture and reestablish a healthy and peaceful diplomacy with other nations.

Otaku 

Otaku (Japanese: おたくor オタク) is a person who has strong interests or an obsession with Japanese pop subculture products and aesthetics.
Otaku culture is mainly looked down on within Japan, as most of them are known as people who do not contribute to society. Most of the justification behind this dislike of Otaku is heavily associated with Tsutomu Miyazaki, who was believed to have been an Otaku and had committed mass murders in the late 80s.

Kawaii 

The Japanese adjective kawaii can be translated as "cute" or "adorable" and is the drive behind one of Japan's most popular aesthetic cultures. Kawaii culture has its ties to another culture called shōjo, a girl power type movement that has been commodified to sell the image of young girls alongside pop culture and the goods they might be interested in. Shōjo can be seen as Japan's version of "the girl next door" with the cute and innocent aspects of kawaii. It has been associated with fancy goods (frilly and feminine type goods marketed toward young females), character goods (Sanrio, San-X, Studio Ghibli, anime/manga merchandise, etc. marketed to both males and females), entire fashion movements, and idols. As long as a product or person has "cute" elements, it can be seen as kawaii. In 2008, Japan's Ministry of Foreign Affairs moved away from just using traditional cultural aspects to promote their country and started using things like anime and Kawaii Ambassadors as well. The purpose of the Kawaii Ambassadors is to spread Japanese pop culture through their cute personas, using mostly fashion and music. This can also happen at the local level as seen by the mayor of Shibuya designating Kyary Pamyu Pamyu as the "Kawaii Ambassador of Harajuku", famously known  as a hub of Japanese fashion, clothing stores, and youth culture.

Mascots

Kawaii in Japan has been a growing trend for many Japanese markets; they have been used in a range of spaces ranging from schools all the way to large enterprises. The use of cute, childish figures representing certain groups allows for those potentially frightened by them to have these playful mascots that represent them to create a sense of humanity between them. An example would be the Tokyo Metropolitan Police Department mascot known as Pipo-kun, which is an orange-skinned, elfin creature with rabbit ears that are made to listen to the people and an antenna to stay in tune with what is happening. The use of Kawaii in public relations has been a large factor for many and will continue to be used by those who want to have an optimistic view of them.

One type of mascot in Japan noted for their 'Kawaii-ness' are advertising characters known as 'yuru-kiyara' (mascots representing their respective prefectures). Each year Japan celebrates a new winner; for example, 2011's champion was Kumamon (the Mon Bear) of Kumamoto prefecture, pulling in more than 2.5 billion yen in merchandise sales across the nation that year.

Purikura

Purikura, a Japanese shorthand for "print club", are Japanese digital photo sticker booths. It has roots in Japanese kawaii culture, which involves an obsession with beautifying self-representation in photographic forms, particularly among females. By the 1990s, self-photography developed into a major preoccupation among Japanese schoolgirls, who took photos with friends and exchanged copies that could be pasted into kawaii albums.

Purikura originate from the Japanese video game arcade industry. It was conceived in 1994 by Sasaki Miho, inspired by the popularity of girl photo culture and photo stickers in 1990s Japan. She worked for a Japanese game company, Atlus, where she suggested the idea, but it was initially rejected by her male bosses. Atlus eventually decided to pursue Miho's idea, and developed it with the help of a leading Japanese video game company, Sega, which later became the owner of Atlus. Sega and Atlus introduced the Print Club (Purinto Kurabu), the first purikura, in February 1995, initially at game arcades, before expanding to other popular culture locations such as fast food shops, train stations, karaoke establishments and bowling alleys. The success of the original Sega-Atlus machine led to other Japanese arcade game companies producing their own purikura, including SNK's Neo Print in 1996 and Konami's Puri Puri Campus (Print Print Campus) in 1997.

Purikura produced what would later be called selfies. A purikura is essentially a cross between a traditional license/passport photo booth and an arcade video game, with a computer that is connected to a colour video camera and colour printer, and which allows the manipulation of digital images. It involves users posing in front of a camera within the compact booth, having their images taken, and then printing the photos with various effects designed to look kawaii. It presents a series of choices, such as desired backdrops, borders, insertable decorations, icons, text writing options, hair extensions, twinkling diamond tiaras, tenderized light effects, and predesigned decorative margins. These photographic filters were similar to the Snapchat filters that later appeared in the 2010s. Purikura became a popular form of entertainment among youths in Japan, and then across East Asia, in the 1990s.

Japanese idols
Japanese popular culture is highly surrounded by idealized celebrities who appear on many different forms of mass media. One type of popular celebrity an Idol. These idols are mostly girls portrayed for their "cuteness" and "innocence"; they are mostly intended to be role models that everyone adores and to promote a desirable image of fantastical happiness They must maintain a perfect public image and always try to set a good example to young people.

Idols aim to play a wide range of roles as media personalities (tarento), e.g. pop or J-pop singers, panelists of variety programs, bit-part actors, models for magazines and advertisements. Alternative media idols include the emerging net idol, a form of idol in which growing ones popularity on the internet is its base foundation. Many net idol groups create a large standing online before transferring their career towards the professional Music Industry.

Momoiro Clover Z was ranked as the number one female idol group in 2013–2017 surveys. During 2016, about 636 thousand people attended their live concerts, which was the highest record of all female musicians in Japan. The group has been ranked as the most popular female idol group from 2013 to 2017.

The interactions between the Idols and their fans range from live video streaming, concerts, and handshake events. Because of their promotion as Idols,  these celebrities appeal to many different demographics throughout Japan. The emotional attraction to cuteness, including the cuteness these idols have, is seen all over the world.  However, the cute kawaii culture is openly visible throughout Japanese society both visually in manga, fashion, and stuffed animals and internally in situations such as the relationship between idols and their fans.

Fashion 

Japan began to emulate Western fashion during the middle of the 19th century. By the beginning of the 21st century, this emulation has formed street fashion, a fashion style in which the wearer customizes outfits by adopting a mixture of current and traditional trends. Such clothes are generally home-made with the use of material purchased at stores.

At present, there are many styles of dress in Japan, created from a mix of both local and foreign labels. Some of these styles are extreme and avant-garde, similar to the haute couture seen on European catwalks.Though the styles have changed over the years, street fashion is still prominent in Japan today. Young adults can often be found wearing subculture attire in large urban fashion districts such as Harajuku, Ginza, Odaiba, Shinjuku and Shibuya.

Lolita

Cosplay

Geinōkai
Geinōkai  (Japanese:芸能界), meaning "entertainment world" or "the world of show business", encompasses a wide variety of Japanese entertainment from movies and television (including talk shows, music shows, variety shows, etc.) to radio and now the Internet. Geinōjin is a term, often used interchangeably with tarento (タレント), which refers to members of the Geinōkai. Talent refers to a rather large group of people who appear on television from night to night, but cannot be quite classified as actors, singers, or models, or comedians (and are thus given the more vague appellation of "talent" instead). Talents usually appear on variety shows or talk shows and may later move into acting or singing if they are successful.

Television

Modern television history 
The demand for television had changed by the mid-1980s and the commonly viewed dramas such as family-oriented, historical, or mystery declined in popularity. These changes in demand were seen in national television throughout the world. Japan countered this decrease in demand by bringing in new celebrities known as "tarento" (タレント). These tarento celebrities are individuals whose influence stretches over different forms of entertainment such as contestants or hosts in game shows, commercials, or television dramas.

Japanese tokusatsu superhero shows (also known as sentai shows) have had a significant influence on global popular culture. Examples include the Ultraman franchise, the Super Sentai franchise which was localised as Power Rangers in the Western world, and the Metal Hero  franchise which was localised as VR Troopers in the West.

Television dramas 

In the western world, dramas are known to be pieces of literature or plays that have a shocking twist or conflict that causes conflicting endings.  However, in Japan, a television drama or "terebi dorama" (テレビドラマ) is commonly thought of as a "Television Show" which can include drama, romance, and or comedy.

Film 

The kaiju film genre, which features giant monsters such as Godzilla, Gamera, and Ultraman, has become one of Japan's most prevalent film genres since the 1950s, around the same time that science fiction films such as Invasion of the Body Snatchers (1956), and The Blob (1958), were booming in the United States. kaiju is a subgenre of tokusatsu, a genre that encompasses all Japanese films using practical special effects, except for films using only computer-generated imagery (CGI). tokusatsu is credited to special effects director Eiji Tsuburaya, who co-created the Godzilla franchise as well as Ultraman.

Japanese cinema gained international recognition in 1950 with the release of Rashomon, which remains one of the most well-known Japanese films. The film's director, Akira Kurosawa is one of the world's most acclaimed and influential film directors. Several of his subsequent films, such as Seven Samurai (1954) and Ran (1985), are considered among the greatest films ever made. Other noteworthy directors in this era of Japanese cinema include Yasujirō Ozu, Masaki Kobayashi, Kenji Mizoguchi, Kon Ichikawa, Keisuke Kinoshita and Ishirō Honda.

The following Japanese film genres have had a significant influence on global popular culture:

Jidaigeki (Japanese historical fiction)
Samurai cinema (chanbara)  examples include Akira Kurosawa films such as Seven Samurai, The Hidden Fortress and Yojimbo
Ninja fiction  see Ninjas in popular culture
Tokusatsu (Japanese science fiction)
Kaiju (giant monster films)  examples include Godzilla, Gamera and Ultraman
Anime films  see Anime section below
Japanese horror  examples include the Ring and Grudge franchises

Anime 

Anime (Japanese: アニメ) is a movie or television episode of sorts which utilizes animation as an art style iconic to Japan in order to convey a story. Unlike western cartoons, anime can be distinguished by its detail in character design, large array of facial expressions, in-depth character development, wide target audience and rare use of talking animals. These traits are used in order to better the connection between a viewer and the characters. Most of the time, anime is based on animated comics called manga, which is an ancient form of comic writing which dates back to the 12th century.

The world of animated films in Japanese popular culture has been a growing trend since the 1920s. Influenced by Walt Disney and his animated characters, Osamu Tezuka (1925–1989), also known as "manga no kamisama" (which means, "God of Comics") would begin his forty-year evolution of animation, or anime, that would change the content of Japanese comic books. With the creation of his first animated character Astro Boy that was unlike any other animated character; he found the hearts of the Japanese public with a robotic boy who has spiky hair, eyes as big as fists, with rockets on his feet.

Studio Ghibli, a Japanese animation film studio, also contributed to anime's worldwide success through films including "My Neighbor Totoro", "Ponyo", and "Spirited Away" (winner of the Golden Bear award in 2002 and the Academy Award for Best Animation Film in 2003). For these works, the studio's current president Hayao Miyazaki is often credited as a visionary in animation.

The success of the Pokémon franchise has been credited by people such as Nissim Otmazgin and sociologist Anne Alison as popularizing anime in the United States. The anime market has also been described as owing greatly to the crucial role of fans as cultural agents, the deterritorializing effects of globalization, the domestication and heavy editing of anime to suit local tastes, and being part of the wider global flow of Japanese pop culture and "soft power". Otmazgin argues that the rise of anime in the United States is a result of the sophisticated graphic quality, a wide thematic diversity, and an inclination to reject the Disney convention of a happy ending. He further states that anime was a tool in which Japan could gain popularity with their pop culture and give Americans a taste of something unique and interesting in the media.

The growing international popularity of anime has led to various animation studios from other countries making their own anime-influenced works.

As anime has grown in its variety of viewers, genres, and themes, the industry has become more prevalent in society. In modern Japan, anime has become so popular that memorable characters have frequently been made into byproducts such as figurines and video games.

Manga 

The word Manga, when translated directly, means "whimsical drawings". Manga aren't typically 'comic books' as the West understands them; rather, they represent pieces of Japanese culture and history. The 'manga' style has an extensive history, beginning sometime in the 10th century; scrolls from that period depict animals as part of the 'upper class', behaving as a typical human would in similar situations. Such scrolls would go on to be known as the Chōjū giga or "The Animal Scrolls".

Scrolls found later on in the 12th century would depict images of religion such as the Gaki Zoshi (Hungry Ghost Scrolls) and the Jigoku zoshi (Hell Scrolls). While both dealt with various aspects of religion, unlike "The Animal Scrolls", these provided a more instructive viewpoint, rather than a comedic style.

Manga are more significant, culturally, than Western comic books (though many fill the same role). Originally, manga were printed in daily newspapers; in the Second World War, newsprint rationing caused a downsurge in manga popularity. In the post-war 1950s, they made a resurgence in the form of "picture card shows", which were a style of storytelling supplemented by the use of illustrations, and the highly popular "rental manga" that would allow their readers to rent these illustrated books for a period of time.

Since their inception manga have gained a considerable worldwide consumerbase.

Doujinshi 
Doujinshi is a Japanese word which refers to amateur manga and fanfictions. They follow the same steps of creation that manga have, and are often created by amateur authors who are manga fans. Doujinshi enable fans to create their own amateur manga involving their favorite manga characters in it. Fanfictions are really popular in Japan, where there is a biannual fair dedicated to doujinshi in Tokyo called Comiket.

Video games 

Video gaming is a major industry in Japan. Japanese game development is often identified with the golden age of video games, including Nintendo under Shigeru Miyamoto and Hiroshi Yamauchi, Sega during the same time period, and other companies such as Taito, Bandai Namco Entertainment, Capcom, and Square Enix, among others.

A good number of Japanese video game franchises such as Super Smash Bros., Pokémon, Super Mario, Sonic the Hedgehog, Kirby, Star Fox, Metroid, The Legend of Zelda, Castlevania, Animal Crossing, Shin Megami Tensei: Persona, Resident Evil, Dark Souls, Final Fantasy and Monster Hunter have gained critical acclaim and continue to garner a large international following. The Japanese game development engine RPG Maker has also gained popularity, with hundreds of games being created with it and released on Steam by the late 2010s.

Music

J-pop

City pop

Visual kei 

Visual kei (Japanese: ヴィジュアル系), also known as "visual style", is a prominent wave in Japan's music world that encapsulates bands with androgynous appearances who play a variety of music styles ranging from heavy metal to electronic. Similar to cosplay, visual kei artists typically cross- dress and flaunt very embellished costumes, make-up, and hairstyles. Not many of the bands include female members, however a majority of their audiences are young females.

Starting in the 1980s and rising to popularity in the 1990s, the first generation of visual kei was heavily influenced by western rock and metal musicians such as Kiss. One of the pioneers is a band called X Japan who are still active. Although, the first wave of visual kei came to an end at the time of X Japan's lead guitarists death in 1999. A few years later, the second wave called neo- visual kei transpired and took the genre onto a slightly different path than before.

Internet

Internet in Japan didn't take off until 1993 when the nation's government approved and installed its first commercial Internet service provider. Japan was the 14th country in the world to start using the internet; many reasons have been cited as the reason behind its slow movement such as bad timing, the government deeming internet access was more for academic use, fear of change and taking risks, an initial lack of competition in the telecommunications field, the difficulty of using a keyboard with a 2,000+ kanji-based language, and high rates causing hefty bills after just a few hours of internet usage. Until the mid-1990s, it was hard for Japanese society to access the internet and there wasn't much for them to do once they did get on. Once it did kick off, mobile phones were preferred over PCs or laptop computers, which has shaped how Japan's internet culture is interfaced, having to adapt to smaller screens and having a more leisurely attitude towards it.

Internet cafés 

Internet cafés in Japan are on the rise in popularity, not just as a place to hang out but as a place to live. These cafes offer internet access in small, private rooms the size of a cubicle with some offering services such as unlimited drinks, doubling as a manga cafe, showers, blankets, and use of the address to those that choose to live there. Internet cafes are now a haven for Net cafe refugees of all ages who would otherwise be homeless; many people can afford to rent out a room at one considering they are not expected to pay other bills that come with an apartment such as deposits, fees, furnishing a living space, and utilities. In 2018 the Tokyo Metropolitan Government conducted a survey using 502 internet and manga cafes in the Tokyo area and found through the information provided that an estimated 15,000 people stay at these cafes during the week with roughly 4,000 of this number being those that are homeless and the rest using the cafe instead of a hotel. A third of the guests claim to have unstable jobs. By age, the bulk of the guests are in their 30s with a smaller but still significant portion of people in their 50s. In 2008, the Health, Labor, and Welfare Ministry requested the budget for a program that would help internet cafe refugees gain permanent employment by offering a loan program for living expenses as long as they take classes on vocational job skills and training.

Mobile phone culture

Keitai shousetsu (cell phone novel) 

Keitai Shousetsu (lit. cell phone novel) was a phenomenon originally unique to Japan but spread quickly to other countries like China, India, Italy, Switzerland, Finland, South Africa, the US, and Brazil. Because of Japan's preference for mobile phones over computers, cell phone novels were an inexpensive way for amateur authors to get their works out into the world either by text message or email, eventually evolving into subscriptions via websites. Deep Love was the first of its kind, written in 2002 by Yoshi; it was adapted into manga series, a television show, and a film. The works were put out in short installments due to the character limit capability of a cell phone which is ideal for commuters to read in between train stops. Oftentimes, these works are put into print; in 2007, Japan saw ten of that year's bestselling novels derived from a cell phone novel. Considering they are mostly written by teenagers and young adults, they center on themes like relationships, drug use, pregnancy, rape, and prostitution. It is a trend that older adults are finding hard to indulge in because of the seemingly violent themes, use of emojis to convey emotion and save space, along with the absence of diverse and lengthy vocabulary.

Selfie 

The modern selfie has origins in Japanese kawaii culture, particularly the purikura phenomenon of 1990s Japan. To capitalize on the purikura phenomenon, Japanese mobile phones began including a front-facing camera, which facilitated the creation of selfies, during the late 1990s to early 2000s. The iPhone 4 (2010) adopted the front-facing camera feature from earlier Japanese and Korean camera phones, and helped popularize the selfie internationally outside of East Asia. Photographic features in purikura were later adopted by smartphone apps such as Instagram and Snapchat, including scribbling graffiti or typing text over selfies, adding features that beautify the image, and photo editing options such as cat whiskers or bunny ears.

See also

 Akihabara
 Culture of Japan
 Glocalization
 Japanese idol
 Japanese pop culture in the United States
 Japanese influence on Korean culture 
 Japanophilia
 Lolita fashion
 Marriage in Japan
 Media mix
 Otaku
 Pachinko
 VTuber

References

External links